Sanni Rantala (born 8 July 2002) is a Finnish ice hockey player and member of the Finnish national ice hockey team, currently playing in the Naisten Liiga (NSML) with KalPa Naiset.

Rantala won a bronze medal in the women's ice hockey tournament at the 2022 Winter Olympics in Beijing.

International play 
Rantala was officially named to the Finnish roster for the 2020 IIHF Women's World Championship on 4 March 2020, before the tournament was cancelled on 7 March 2020 due to public health concerns related to the COVID-19 pandemic. She appeared on the national team roster for all four of the tournaments of the 2019–20 Euro Hockey Tour.

After a knee injury sustained in a preseason game kept her in rehabilitation and off the ice for the entire 2020–21 season, the 2022 Winter Olympics served as Rantala's senior-level IIHF debut. She played in all seven games and scored two points in the tournament, a goal and an assist, both tallied against the Russian Olympic Committee (ROC) during the group stage. With 8 penalty minutes, she was also the most penalized Finnish player.

Career statistics

International

References

External links 
 
 

2002 births
Living people
Finnish women's ice hockey defencemen
Ice hockey players at the 2022 Winter Olympics
KalPa Naiset players
Kiekko-Espoo Naiset players
Medalists at the 2022 Winter Olympics
Olympic ice hockey players of Finland
Olympic bronze medalists for Finland
Olympic medalists in ice hockey
People from Riihimäki
Sportspeople from Kanta-Häme
Team Kuortane players